Verbascum dumulosum, the shrubby mullein, is a species of flowering plant in the family Scrophulariaceae, native to south west Turkey. As it requires sharp drainage, it is often planted in full sun in a gravel bed or in rock crevices.

The specific epithet dumulosum means "bushy".

It has gained the Royal Horticultural Society's Award of Garden Merit.

References

Flora of Turkey
dumulosum